Braunstone may refer to:

 Braunstone Town, a town in the Blaby district of Leicestershire, England
 Braunstone Park, a public park in Braunstone Town, Leicester, England
 Braunstone Park & Rowley Fields, a ward of the city of Leicester, England, encompassing the suburb of Braunstone Frith
 Braunstone, New South Wales, a locality in Australia